Digital nomads are people who travel freely while working remotely using technology and the internet. Such people generally have minimal material possessions and work remotely in temporary housing, hotels, cafes, public libraries, co-working spaces, or recreational vehicles, using Wi-Fi, smartphones or mobile hotspots to access the Internet. The majority of digital nomads describe themselves as programmers, content creators, designers, or developers. Some digital nomads are perpetual travelers, while others only maintain the lifestyle for a short period of time. While some nomads travel through multiple countries, others remain in one area, and some may choose to travel while living in a vehicle, in a practice often known as van-dwelling. In 2020, a research study found that 10.9 million American workers described themselves as digital nomads, an increase of 49% from 2019.

Etymology
One of the first digital nomads was Steve Roberts, who in 1983 rode on a computerized recumbent bicycle and was featured in Popular Computing magazine; the magazine referred to him as a "high-tech nomad".

The term "digital nomad" started to be used in the early 1990s to describe a new type of high tech traveling lifestyle made possible by the growth of computer networking and popularization of mobile devices like laptops, tablets and PDAs. In his 1992 travelogue Exploring the Internet, Carl Malamud described a "digital nomad" who "travels the world with a laptop, setting up FidoNet nodes." In 1993, Random House published the Digital Nomad's Guide series of guidebooks by Mitch Ratcliffe and Andrew Gore. The guidebooks, PowerBook, AT&T EO Personal Communicator, and Newton's Law, used the term "digital nomad" to refer to the increased mobility and more powerful communication and productivity technologies that new mobile devices introduced.

Craig McCaw predicted in 1993 that the union of telecommunication and computing would create a new nomadic industry. By enabling people to conduct business from any location, wireless communication and digital assistants would facilitate a return to a nomadic lifestyle where people moved as they wished and took their environment and possessions with them.

The 1997 book Digital Nomad by Tsugio Makimoto and David Manners used the term to describe how technology allows for a return of societies to a nomadic lifestyle. Makimoto and Manners identified an emerging "digital nomad" lifestyle freed by technology "from the constraints of geography and distance."

In contemporary usage, the term broadly describes a category of highly mobile, location-independent professionals who are able to live and work remotely from anywhere in the world with internet access, due to the integration of mobile technology into everyday life and work settings.

Benefits
People typically become digital nomads due to a desire to travel and location independence. and the lowered cost of living often provided by leaving expensive cities. Cost of living ranks chief among the criteria that digital nomads value when selecting a destination, followed by climate, diversity, and available leisure activities. There are also benefits for employers, as a 2021 study concluded that there is a causal relationship between worker productivity and the option to "work from anywhere," as workers who were freed from geographic limitations showed an average output increase of 4.4% while controlling for other factors. Digital nomads also typically spend more than 35% of their income in the location in which they are staying, an injection of capital that has been shown to stimulate local economies in popular destinations, primarily promoting the service industry and the sale of consumer goods.

Challenges
Although digital nomads enjoy advantages in freedom and flexibility, they report loneliness as their biggest struggle, followed by burnout. Feelings of loneliness are often an issue for digital nomads because nomadism usually requires freedom from personal attachments such as marriage. The importance of developing face-to-face quality relationships has been stressed to maintain mental health in remote workers.

Other challenges include maintaining international health insurance with coverage globally, abiding by different local laws including payment of required taxes and obtaining work visas, and maintaining long-distance relationships with friends and family back home. Digital nomads also very rarely have access to retirement benefits, unemployment insurance, or set time off from work, and often make less money than they could make through traditional employment. As many digital nomads resort to gig work or freelancing, their opportunities for pay can be inconsistent and sporadic. Other challenges may also include time zone differences, the difficulty of finding a reliable connection to the internet, and the absence of delineation between work and leisure time. There are a few contributing factors to the blurring of this line; certain paid work can be viewed as leisure when it is enjoyable, but many tasks that involve travel and acquiring commdations can become viewed as another type of work, even though those would traditionally fall into the leisure category.  Another issue faced by digital nomads is that of mobility; a travelling worker must be able to keep any necessary equipment with them as they move from location to location, and it is difficult to for a digital nomad to manage personal belongings. In fact, many digital nomads do not have a "home base," and must therefore adopt a minimalist lifestyle.

One potentially negative impact of digital nomadism, that does not affect the nomads themselves, is the possibility of 'transnational gentrification.' Concerns have been raised about the nature of the relationship between digital nomads, who are most often from the Global North, and the countries they travel to, generally in the Global South. The problem may arise in regards to housing competition between native people and travelling workers, as well as in personal interactions and the risk of tourism over-dependency. However, the exact scope and real-world impacts of this problem have not yet been settled by research.

Impact of COVID-19 
In 2020, a research study found that 10.9 million American workers described themselves as digital nomads, an increase of 49% from 2019. The primary reason for this rapid increase is office closure and the shift toward remote work due to the COVID-19 Pandemic. Multiple countries were prompted to offer new visa programs and to change their policies towards foreign workers as a result of the pandemic.

The pandemic had a larger impact, in terms of mobility, on traditional job holders than on independent workers. While the number of independent workers living as digital nomads increased slightly in 2020, the number of traditional workers who changed their lifestyle to live as digital nomads nearly doubled, from 3.2 million people in 2019 to 6.3 million in 2020. This is because many traditional jobs stopped requiring their employees to physically report to an office or set location everyday, so many people were subsequently able to travel freely while still working. The majority of this increase consisted of Millennial and Generation Z workers, possibly due in part to their minimized concern about COVID-19. At the same time, another effect of the pandemic was the limited ability to travel, particularly across national borders. For this reason, more and more digital nomads have chosen to remain domestic, especially in the United States. Living as a digital nomad often entails travelling from high-cost areas (eg. major cities) to cheaper regions (foreign or domestic).

Though the rapid increase of digital nomads in 2020 is expected to be more than just a short-lived trend, the extreme rate of change is not likely to continue indefinitely.

Legality
Many digital nomads tend to come from more developed nations with passports allowing a greater degree of freedom of travel. As a result, many tend to travel on a travel visa; working while on a travel visa can be technically illegal and controversial.

Digital nomad visas 
Several visa programs are targeted at digital nomads.

Antigua and Barbuda 
In 2020, Antigua and Barbuda announced a digital nomad visa called the Nomad Digital Residence (NDR). The visa allows digital nomads who work for a company outside of Antigua and Barbuda to stay in the country for two years.

Argentina 
In May 2022, the Argentinian government announced that it would be implementing a temporary visa targeted at digital nomads. The visa is valid for six months and can be renewed for an additional six.

Bermuda 
On August 1, 2020, Bermuda opened applications for its digital nomad visa, entitled "Work From Bermuda." The visa is an expansion on an older residency program and allows digital nomads to live in the country for one year.

Brazil 
In February 2022, Brazil announced that it would be introducing a digital nomad visa for foreign nationals employed by a foreign company, under Resolution 45. The resolution allows non-Brazilian workers to apply for a visa that lets them stay in the country for 90 days in a 180-day period, or 180 days in a one-year period. The digital nomad visa is valid for one year and renewable for another year.

Cayman Islands 
On October 21, 2020, the Cayman Islands launched the Global Citizen Concierge Program. Foreign workers need to have an employment letter from an entity outside of the Cayman Islands and a minimum salary of $100,000.

Costa Rica 
On August 11, 2021, Costa Rica passed a law granting visas to digital nomads. The law allows foreign nationals and their families to live and work in the country for a year, and the visa can be extended for up to one year. The visa requires foreign nationals to have an income greater than $3000 USD per month. Families applying for the visa need to have an income greater than $5000 USD per month.

Croatia 
In January 2021,  Croatia began offering special visas to digital workers from outside of the European Union. The visa allows digital nomads to stay in the country for up to a year while being exempt from paying income taxes.

Estonia 
E-Residency in Estonia was launched in December 2014, allowing remote workers to register their business in Estonia. In 2020, Estonia launched a digital nomad visa, allowing remote workers to live in Estonia for up to a year and legally work for their employer or their own company registered abroad.

Georgia 
In August 2020, Georgia launched a program entitled "Remotely from Georgia." Under the program, citizens from 95 countries can travel and work remotely in the country for at least 360 days without a visa.

Hungary 
In 2022, Hungary introduced the White Card, a residency permit for digital nomads. Under the permit, foreign nationals can live in Hungary while working for a company outside of the country. The permit is for one year and can be extended for an additional year.

Iceland 
In November 2020, Iceland signed an amendment to allow foreign nationals to live in Iceland for up to six months under a long-term visa.

Indonesia 
In June 2022, Indonesia announced plans to introduce a digital nomad visa that would allow remote workers to live in the country tax-free for five years. The announcement was made by Indonesia's Minister of Tourism, Sandiaga Uno. Uno stated that he hopes to bring up to 3.6 million digital nomads to the country with this plan.

Italy 
In 2022, Italy announced that it would be launching a digital nomad visa. The visa was voted into law on March 28, 2022, as a part of a government decree known as "decreto sostegni ter." The bill remains to be implemented into law, and full details of the digital nomad visa application process and requirements remain unknown.

Latvia 
In February 2022, Latvia's Cabinet of Ministers approved draft amendments to its immigration law to allow third-country nationals to apply for a one-year visa to reside in Latvia while working remotely either for a foreign-registered employer or as self-employed persons.

Malta 
In September 2021, Malta opened applications for its year-long digital nomad visa program. The Malta government stated that the visa can be renewed at the discretion of Residency Malta.

Mauritius 
In February 2022, Mauritius announced that it would be expanding its premium visa to digital nomads. The premium visa allows remote workers to stay in the country for up to a year.

Portugal 
In October 2022, Portugal announced it would be accepting applications for Remote Work/Digital Nomad VISAs starting from October 30, 2022.

Romania 
On December 21, 2021, Romanian parliament passed legislation for a digital nomad visa. The visa is valid for six months. It can be extended for another six months if foreign workers have proof of full or part-time employment for at least three years prior to their application and have a valid proof of income for the last six months that is three times the Romanian average gross salary.

Spain 
In 2021, Spain announced plans for a digital nomad visa. The law responsible for the digital nomad visa is known as the Startup Law. In December 2021, the law was presented to parliament, and in January 2022, a draft of the law was approved. According to the draft of the law, the Spain Digital Nomad Visa will allow digital nomads to reside in Spain for five years and receive special tax exemptions by paying a non-income tax.

South Africa 
In March 2022, South Africa announced that it would update its visa laws to be allow digital nomads to stay in the country for more than 90 days.

United Arab Emirates 
In October 2020, the city of Dubai in the United Arab Emirates launched a visa program that allows digital nomads and remote workers to stay in the country for one year. To qualify, foreign workers need at least $5,000 in income per month and a letter confirming employment.

Other countries 
Other countries such as Argentina, Barbados, Brazil, and Greece offer similar digital nomad visa programs. Some digital nomads have used Germany's residence permit for the purpose of freelance or self-employment to legalize their stay, but successful applicants must have a tangible connection and reason to stay in Germany.

References

Employment classifications
Internet culture
Itinerant living
Migrant workers
Expatriates
Diaspora studies
Employment of foreign-born